Vladyslav Mykolayovych Prudius (born 22 June 1973) is a Ukrainian professional football coach and a former player. He is a coach at the Russian academy UOR #5 Yegoryevsk. He also holds Russian citizenship.

Club career
He made his professional debut in the Soviet Second League B in 1991 for FC Mayak Kharkiv. He played 2 games in the 1999 UEFA Intertoto Cup for FC Rostselmash Rostov-on-Don.

Honours
 Ukrainian Premier League champion: 1994.

References

1973 births
People from Romny
Living people
Ukrainian footballers
Association football midfielders
Ukraine international footballers
Ukraine under-21 international footballers
FC Olympik Kharkiv players
FC Metalist Kharkiv players
FC Dynamo Kyiv players
FC Arsenal Kyiv players
FC Rostov players
FC Lokomotiv Nizhny Novgorod players
FC Anzhi Makhachkala players
FC Sokol Saratov players
FC SKA Rostov-on-Don players
FC Vorskla Poltava players
FC Baltika Kaliningrad players
Ukrainian Premier League players
Ukrainian First League players
Russian Premier League players
Ukrainian football managers
Sportspeople from Sumy Oblast